This is a list of all known elevator test towers in the world.

List

Elevator test towers of unknown height

References

 
Lists of buildings and structures
Engineering-related lists